Unio Bernhard Sarlin (6 January 1893 – 19 March 1981) was a Finnish sport shooter who competed in the 1924 Summer Olympics. He was also a member of the Jäger Movement and an important army officer. In 1924 he finished seventh in the 25 m rapid fire pistol competition.

References

External links
Biography (in Finnish)

1893 births
1981 deaths
Finnish male sport shooters
ISSF pistol shooters
Olympic shooters of Finland
Shooters at the 1924 Summer Olympics
Finnish Army personnel
People of the Finnish Civil War (White side)
Sportspeople from Helsinki
Jägers of the Jäger Movement